Venus Over Manhattan, known as Venus, is an art gallery founded in 2012 by Adam Lindemann, with two locations in Manhattan.

History

Manhattan
The New York space is dedicated to curated exhibitions both historic and contemporary, which cast a unique and often iconoclastic view on the work of established artists or artists whose works have been somewhat overlooked.

Past exhibitions have included those of Alexander Calder, Jack Goldstein, Billy Al Bengston, William Copley, Raymond Pettibon, Walter Dahn, Peter Saul, Joseph Elmer Yoakum, Roy De Forest, Maryan, Roger Brown, Öyvind Fahlström Charlotte Perriand, Bernard Buffet John McCracken, David Medalla, Katherine Bernhardt, and H.C. Westermann. In New York, VENUS has collaborated with artist foundations, estates, and galleries including The Calder Foundation, White Columns, Sprüth Magers, David Zwirner, the estate of William Copley and the estate of Allan Frumkin.

Los Angeles
Venus opened its Los Angeles space in May 2015. The Los Angeles gallery hosts a primary program in a 14,500 square foot exhibition space in the downtown arts district. It presents exhibitions by a roster of established and emerging talent including Dan Colen, Katherine Bernhardt, Dan McCarthy, Adel Abdessemed, Marianne Vitale, and Elaine Cameron-Weir. Venus Over Los Angeles closed in September of 2017 because of neighborhood protests against gentrification.

Artists
The gallery represents several living artists, including:
 Pinchas Burstein (since 2022)
 Peter Saul (since 2019)
 Sally Saul (since 2022)
 Keiichi Tanaami

References

External links

Art museums and galleries in Manhattan
2012 establishments in New York City
Upper East Side